Okuta is a town located in the Baruten Local Government Area of Kwara State, Nigeria.

Geography 

Ruler 
Edidi is currently under the rulership of His Royal Majesty, Alhaji Idris Abubakar Seropetete lll as of 2019.

Festivals 
Festivals in Edidi include:

 Okuta Gaani Festival: Occurs annually in January/February. It is a celebration of religion, culture, and dance which brings participants from nearby countries as well as the local area.

References

External links
 Gaani; a cultural festival that promotes trans-border relations - ilorin.info

Populated places in Kwara State
Towns in Yorubaland